Best High School may refer to:

 Best High School (Ahmedabad), India
 BEST High School (Kirkland, Washington), United States
 BEST High School, part of the McClymonds Educational Complex in Oakland, California, United States